Heath Michael Phillips (born March 24, 1982) is an American former professional baseball player and coach. Heath is a coach in the prestigious Scorpions Baseball Travel Program and is the pitching coach for Shorter University in Georgia.

Education
He graduated from Evansville Central High School in 2000. He attended Lake City Community College in Florida.

As a designated hitter, he batted .324 with 6 home runs and led the state in doubles (24) and RBI (68).

Draft and minor leagues
He was selected by the Chicago White Sox in the 2000 Major League Baseball Draft in the 10th round as the 292nd overall pick. He did not sign with the White Sox until May 12, 2001.

In , Phillips played the whole season with the Triple-A Charlotte Knights. He was named the International League Most Valuable Pitcher after going 13-5 with a 2.96 ERA. Heath was a member of the Team USA Olympic Qualifier 2006 team that won gold in Cuba. His teammates included Billy Butler, Kurt Suzuki, Michael Bourn, Mark Reynolds and was managed by Davey Johnson.

In , Phillips began the year at Charlotte again. He finished the season going 13-7 with a 4.30 ERA in 28 starts. He was rewarded with a September callup after the minor league season was over when rosters expanded.

Major league career
In Phillips' first two major league games, which were relief appearances, he got a win and a loss. Phillips made his major league debut on September 5, against the Detroit Tigers. He got the loss against the Tigers when he came into the game in the bottom of the 11th inning. He had two outs when he gave up the game winning single to Timo Pérez. In his second career game, on September 7, Phillips got the win against the Minnesota Twins. He had once again pitched in the extra innings, this time coming into the game in the top of the 13th inning. He pitched just that inning as the White Sox won the game in the bottom of the 13th inning.

On January 5, he signed a minor league deal with the New York Yankees. He was released by the Yankees on July 19, 2008. On July 29, 2008, Phillips signed a minor league contract with the Tampa Bay Rays and became a free agent at the end of the season. On December 17, 2008, he signed a minor league contract with the Kansas City Royals.

Phillips finished his career by playing in the Atlantic League of Professional Baseball for the Long Island Ducks in 2011 and the Sugar Land Skeeters in 2012.

References

External links

1982 births
Living people
Baseball players from Indiana
Birmingham Barons players
Cañeros de Los Mochis players
Charlotte Knights players
Chicago White Sox players
Durham Bulls players
Kannapolis Intimidators players
Lake City Timberwolves baseball players
Leones del Escogido players
American expatriate baseball players in the Dominican Republic
Long Island Ducks players
Major League Baseball pitchers
Omaha Royals players
Scranton/Wilkes-Barre Yankees players
Sportspeople from Evansville, Indiana
Sugar Land Skeeters players
Tiburones de La Guaira players
American expatriate baseball players in Venezuela
Winston-Salem Warthogs players